Cole's Pacific Electric Buffet, also known as Cole's P.E. Buffet, is a restaurant and bar located at 118 East 6th Street in the Historic Core district of downtown Los Angeles, California, the oldest operating in Los Angeles at the same location since its founding.

Cole's was founded in 1908 by Henry Cole on the ground floor of the Pacific Electric Building, which served as the main terminal for the Pacific Electric Railway. Cole's unique table tops were made from the varnished doors of retired Red Cars of the Pacific Electric Railway. The tables were removed as part of the renovation and were reportedly relocated to the developer's nearby corporate headquarters above Clifton's Cafeteria. 

The restaurant claims (along with Philippe's) that the first French dip sandwich was served at Cole's in the same year.  Some have suggested that Philippe's is the original, as the sandwich was named "French" dip because of the original proprietor Philippe Mathieu's French heritage. However, according to carvers at Cole's, Henry Cole first dipped the French bread in jus at the request of a customer who had had recent dental work.  The French bread was too hard and it hurt this customer's teeth, so Henry dipped the bread in order to soften it. Other customers, with perfectly good teeth, saw Henry dip the bread and requested that he do the same for them - and thus the French dip was born. Other theories exist, so debate is likely to continue.

Henry Cole also operated Los Angeles's first check cashing service from the restaurant.

Henry Cole was later arrested in 1942 by the Federal Government for fraud.

Cole's was designated a Los Angeles Historic-Cultural Monument in 1989.

The location resembles the bar from Who Framed Roger Rabbit, complete with reference to “French dip” on menu.

Note on new corporate owner

Cole's had boasted being the oldest restaurant and bar in the city of Los Angeles continuously operated from the same location—until a shutdown for major remodeling on March 15, 2007.  The restaurant's new corporate owner, Pouring with Heart’s Cedd Moses, was quoted in the Los Angeles Downtown News, saying the restaurant would reopen in time for its 100th anniversary in January 2008; however, the project was delayed, and Cole's finally reopened in December 2008.

References

External links

1908 establishments in California
American companies established in 1908
Buildings and structures in Downtown Los Angeles
History of Los Angeles
Landmarks in Los Angeles
Restaurants established in 1908
Restaurants in Los Angeles